Tanah Merah Constituency was a constituency in Singapore. It was created in 1980 by merging parts of Bedok and Changi constituencies. In 1988, it was abolished and merged into Bedok Group Representation Constituency.

Member of Parliament

Elections

Elections in the 1980s

References

Singaporean electoral divisions
Bedok